Kozhva is an urban locality (an urban-type settlement) under the administrative jurisdiction of the town of republic significance of Pechora in the Komi Republic, Russia. As of the 2010 Census, its population was 3,047.

History
Urban-type settlement status was granted to Kozhva in 1952.

Administrative and municipal status
Within the framework of administrative divisions, the urban-type settlement of Kozhva, together with the urban-type settlement of Izyayu and six rural localities, is incorporated as Kozhva Urban-Type Settlement Administrative Territory, which is subordinated to the town of republic significance of Pechora. As a municipal division, Kozhva Urban-Type Settlement Administrative Territory is incorporated within Pechora Municipal District as Kozhva Urban Settlement.

References

Notes

Sources

Urban-type settlements in the Komi Republic